"Saturday Nights" is a song by American singer Khalid from his 2018 EP Suncity. The original solo version charted as a song from the EP upon its release in October 2018, then was released as a single in a remix version with fellow American singer Kane Brown on January 11, 2019. The remix reached a peak of number 57 on the US Billboard Hot 100 in January 2019. The song was later included as a bonus track on his second album, Free Spirit, and the remix was included on the Japanese deluxe edition of the album.

Charts

Original version

Weekly charts

Year-end charts

Remix

Weekly charts

Year-end charts

Certifications

References

2018 songs
2019 singles
Khalid (singer) songs
Kane Brown songs
Songs written by Khalid (singer)